Peripsocus is a genus of stout barklice in the family Peripsocidae. There are more than 250 described species in Peripsocus.

See also
 List of Peripsocus species

References

Peripsocidae
Articles created by Qbugbot